María de la Almudena de Arteaga y del Alcázar, 20th Duchess of the Infantado GE (born in Madrid on 25 June 1967), is an outstanding Spanish writer in the genre of the historical novel.

Biography
She was born in Madrid on 25 June 1967, the city where she currently resides with her husband and two daughters. She has a degree in law from the Complutense University of Madrid and a diploma in Genealogy, Heraldry and Nobility from the Salazar y Castro Institute.

She practiced law for six years, specializing in Civil and Labor Law. She worked as a documentary filmmaker on the books La insigne Orden del Toisón de Oro and La Orden Real de España, a historical essay. In 1997 she published her first novel La Princesa de Éboli. After the success obtained, she left the practice of Law to dedicate herself exclusively to literature. Twenty works of different genres followed this first novel.

Recognized by critics as one of the most outstanding current historical novel writers, her books have reached the bestseller lists for more than four months, with numerous reissues and have been translated into several languages. Premio de Novela Histórica Alfonso X El Sabio 2004 (Alfonso X El Sabio Historical Novel Award) 2004 with María de Molina. Tres coronas medievales. In March 2012, she was awarded the 19th Premio Azorín de Novela (Azorín Prize for Best Novel) for her work Capricho, a historical tour with intrigue through 19th century Madrid.

Currently she continues to write, lecture in literary and historical forums and collaborate as a columnist in national newspapers and magazines.

House of the Infantado
Following the approval of Law 33/2006, of 30 October, on the equality of men and women in the order of succession, Almudena, as the first-born daughter, became the main heir to the House of the Infantado, displacing her brother Íñigo, 20th Marquis of Tavara, who until a few years ago, as the first-born among men, was called to be the 20th Duke of the Infantado, and who died in 2012 in a plane crash, and his brother Iván, 16th Marquis of Armunia.

On 17 November 2018, the succession in favor of the Duchy of the Infantado, as well as five other titles of nobility and dignities, was published in the Official State Gazette.

Nobility titles
 20th Duchess of Infantado, 21st Marchioness of Santillana, 22nd Countess of Saldaña, 21st Countess of Real de Manzanares, titles of the House of the Infantado.
 18th Duchess of Cea
 21st Countess of Real de Manzanares
 14th Countess of Monclova
 8th Countess of Corres
 25th Lady of the House of Lazcano
 24th Admiral of Aragon

References

External links
 Author's official website
 Interview after winning the Alfonso X El Sabio award

Writers from Madrid
21st-century Spanish novelists
20th-century Spanish novelists
Marquesses of Spain
Spanish women writers
20th-century Spanish women
21st-century Spanish women
Living people
1967 births